Anthony Henderson may refer to:

Anthony M. Henderson (born 1966), U.S. Marine Corps general
Tony Henderson (born 1954), English footballer
Krayzie Bone (Anthony Henderson, born 1973), American rapper